Wayne Francis Harris (born 17 December 1960 in Muswellbrook, New South Wales) is an Australian jockey who is best known for riding Jeune to victory in the 1994 Melbourne Cup.

References

Australian jockeys
Sportsmen from New South Wales
Living people
1960 births
People from the Hunter Region
20th-century Australian people